This is a list of the wild birds found in Western Australia. The list includes introduced species, common vagrants, recently extinct species, extirpated species, some very rare vagrants (seen once) and species only present in captivity. 629 species are listed.

The taxonomy is based on Christidis and Boles, 2008. Their system has been developed over nearly two decades and has strong local support, but deviates in important ways from more generally accepted schemes.

This list's taxonomic treatment (designation and sequence of orders, families and species) and nomenclature (common and scientific names) follow the conventions of The Clements Checklist of Birds of the World, 2022 edition. All of the birds below are included in the total bird count for Western Australia.

The following tags have been used to highlight several categories. The commonly occurring native species do not fall into any of these categories.

 (A) Accidental – a species that rarely or accidentally occurs in Western Australia
 (E) Endemic – a species endemic to Western Australia
 (I) Introduced – a species introduced to Western Australia as a consequence, direct or indirect, of human actions
 (Ex) Extirpated – a species that no longer occurs in Western Australia although populations exist elsewhere
 (X) Extinct – a species or subspecies that no longer exists.

Ostriches
Order: StruthioniformesFamily: Struthionidae

This order is not native to Western Australia, but feral populations of one species have become established.

Cassowaries and emu
Order: CasuariiformesFamily: Dromaiidae

This family of flightless ratite birds is represented by two living species in Australia. Another two species are found in New Guinea. The extinct, geographically-isolated King and Kangaroo Island emus were historically considered to be separate species to mainland emus. However, genetic evidence from 2011 suggests that all three are conspecific.

Magpie goose
Order: AnseriformesFamily: Anseranatidae

The family contains a single species, the magpie goose. It was an early and distinctive offshoot of the anseriform family tree, diverging after the screamers and before all other ducks, geese and swans, sometime in the late Cretaceous. The single species is found across Australia.

Ducks, geese, and waterfowl
Order: AnseriformesFamily: Anatidae

The family Anatidae includes the ducks and most duck-like waterfowl, such as geese and swans. These are adapted for an aquatic existence, with webbed feet, bills that are flattened to a greater or lesser extent, and feathers that are excellent at shedding water due to special oils.

Megapodes
Order: GalliformesFamily: Megapodiidae

Megapodiidae are represented by various species in the Australasian region. They are commonly referred to as "mound-builders" due to their habit of constructing large mounds to incubate their eggs.

Guineafowl
Order: GalliformesFamily: Numididae

Numididae are not native to Australia, but feral populations of one species exist in Western Australia.

Pheasants, grouse, and allies
Order: GalliformesFamily: Phasianidae

Phasianidae consists of the pheasants and their allies. These are terrestrial species, variable in size but generally plump, with broad, relatively short wings. Many species are gamebirds or have been domesticated as a food source for humans.

Grebes
Order: PodicipediformesFamily: Podicipedidae

Grebes are small to medium-large freshwater diving birds. They have lobed toes and are excellent swimmers and divers. However, they have their feet placed far back on the body, making them quite ungainly on land.

Pigeons and doves
Order: ColumbiformesFamily: Columbidae

Pigeons and doves are stout-bodied birds with short necks and short slender bills with a fleshy cere.

Bustards
Order: OtidiformesFamily: Otididae

Cuckoos
Order: CuculiformesFamily: Cuculidae

Frogmouths
Order: CaprimulgiformesFamily: Podargidae

The frogmouths are a distinctive group of small nocturnal birds related to swifts found from India across southern Asia to Australia.

Nightjars and allies
Order: CaprimulgiformesFamily:  Caprimulgidae

Owlet-nightjars
Order: CaprimulgiformesFamily: Aegothelidae

The owlet-nightjars are a distinctive group of small nocturnal birds related to swifts found from the Maluku Islands and New Guinea to Australia and New Caledonia.

Swifts
Order: CaprimulgiformesFamily: Apodidae

Swifts are small birds which spend the majority of their lives flying. These birds have very short legs and never settle voluntarily on the ground, perching instead only on vertical surfaces. Many swifts have long swept-back wings which resemble a crescent or boomerang.

Rails, gallinules, and coots
Order: GruiformesFamily: Rallidae

Cranes
Order: GruiformesFamily: Gruidae

Thick-knees
Order: CharadriiformesFamily: Burhinidae

Stilts and avocets
Order: CharadriiformesFamily: Recurvirostridae

Oystercatchers
Order: CharadriiformesFamily: Haematopodidae

Plovers and lapwings
Order: CharadriiformesFamily: Charadriidae

Painted-snipes
Order: CharadriiformesFamily: Rostratulidae

Jacanas
Order: CharadriiformesFamily: Jacanidae

2 species recorded [1 extant native, 1 vagrant]

Sandpipers and allies
Order: CharadriiformesFamily: Scolopacidae

Buttonquail
Order: CharadriiformesFamily: Turnicidae

Pratincoles and coursers
Order: CharadriiformesFamily: Glareolidae

Skuas and jaegers
Order: CharadriiformesFamily: Stercorariidae

Gulls, terns, and skimmers
Order: CharadriiformesFamily: Laridae

Tropicbirds
Order: PhaethontiformesFamily: Phaethontidae

Tropicbirds are slender white birds of tropical oceans, with exceptionally long central tail feathers. Their long wings have black markings, as does the head.

Penguins
Order: SphenisciformesFamily: Spheniscidae

Penguins are a group of aquatic, flightless birds living almost exclusively in the Southern Hemisphere, especially in Antarctica. Only one species, the little penguin, breeds on the Australian coast.

Albatrosses
Order: ProcellariiformesFamily: Diomedeidae

The albatrosses are a family of large seabird found across the Southern and North Pacific Oceans. The largest are among the largest flying birds in the world.

Southern storm-petrels
Order: ProcellariiformesFamily: Oceanitidae

The southern storm-petrels are the smallest seabirds, relatives of the petrels, feeding on planktonic crustaceans and small fish picked from the surface, typically while hovering. Their flight is fluttering and sometimes bat-like.

Northern storm-petrels
Order: ProcellariiformesFamily: Hydrobatidae

Shearwaters and petrels
Order: ProcellariiformesFamily: Procellariidae

The procellariids are the main group of medium-sized "true petrels", characterised by united nostrils with medium nasal septum, and a long outer functional primary flight feather.

Storks

Order: CiconiiformesFamily: Ciconiidae

Frigatebirds
Order: SuliformesFamily: Fregatidae

Boobies and gannets
Order: SuliformesFamily: Sulidae

The sulids comprise the gannets and boobies. Both groups are medium-large coastal seabirds that plunge-dive for fish.

Anhingas
Order: SuliformesFamily: Anhingidae

Anhingas or darters are cormorant-like water birds with long necks and long, straight bills. They are fish eaters which often swim with only their neck above the water.

Cormorants and shags
Order: SuliformesFamily: Phalacrocoracidae

Cormorants are medium-to-large aquatic birds, usually with mainly dark plumage and areas of coloured skin on the face. The bill is long, thin and sharply hooked. Their feet are four-toed and webbed, a distinguishing feature among the order Pelecaniformes.

Pelicans
Order: PelecaniformesFamily: Pelecanidae

Pelicans are large water birds with distinctive pouches under their bills. Like other birds in the order Pelecaniformes, they have four webbed toes.

Herons, egrets, and bitterns
Order: PelecaniformesFamily: Ardeidae

Ibises and spoonbills
Order: PelecaniformesFamily: Threskiornithidae

Osprey
Order: AccipitriformesFamily: Pandionidae

Hawks, eagles, and kites
Order: AccipitriformesFamily: Accipitridae

Barn owls
Order: StrigiformesFamily: Tytonidae

Owls
Order: StrigiformesFamily: Strigidae

Hoopoes
Order: BucerotiformesFamily: Upupidae

Kingfishers
Order: CoraciiformesFamily: Alcedinidae

Bee-eaters

Order: CoraciiformesFamily: Meropidae

Rollers
Order: CoraciiformesFamily: Coraciidae

Falcons and caracaras
Order: FalconiformesFamily: Falconidae

Cockatoos
Order: PsittaciformesFamily:Cacatuidae

Old World parrots
Order: PsittaciformesFamily: Psittaculidae

Pittas
Order: PasseriformesFamily: Pittidae

Scrub-birds
Order: PasseriformesFamily: Atrichornithidae

Bowerbirds
Order: PasseriformesFamily: Ptilonorhynchidae

Australasian treecreepers
Order: PasseriformesFamily: Climacteridae

Fairywrens
Order: PasseriformesFamily: Maluridae

Honeyeaters
Order: PasseriformesFamily: Meliphagidae

Bristlebirds
Order: PasseriformesFamily: Dasyornithidae

Pardalotes
Order: PasseriformesFamily: Pardalotidae

Thornbills and allies
Order: PasseriformesFamily: Acanthizidae

Pseudo-babblers
Order: PasseriformesFamily: Pomatostomidae

Quail-thrushes and jewel-babblers
Order: PasseriformesFamily: Cinclosomatidae

Cuckooshrikes
Order: PasseriformesFamily: Campephagidae

Sittellas
Order: PasseriformesFamily: Neosittidae

Whipbirds and wedgebills
Order: PasseriformesFamily: Psophodidae

Australo-Papuan bellbirds
Order: PasseriformesFamily: Oreoicidae

Shrike-tits
Order: PasseriformesFamily: Falcunculidae

Whistlers and allies
Order: PasseriformesFamily: Pachycephalidae

Old World orioles
Order: PasseriformesFamily: Oriolidae

Woodswallows, bellmagpies, and allies
Order: PasseriformesFamily: Artamidae

Fantails
Order: PasseriformesFamily: Rhipiduridae

Drongos
Order: PasseriformesFamily: Dicruridae

Monarch flycatchers
Order: PasseriformesFamily: Monarchidae

Shrikes
Order: PasseriformesFamily: Laniidae

Crows, jays, and magpies
Order: PasseriformesFamily: Corvidae

Australasian robins
Order: PasseriformesFamily: Petroicidae

Larks
Order: PasseriformesFamily: Alaudidae

Cisticolas and allies

Order: PasseriformesFamily: Cisticolidae

Reed warblers and allies
Order: PasseriformesFamily: Acrocephalidae

Grassbirds and allies
Order: PasseriformesFamily: Locustellidae

Swallows
Order: PasseriformesFamily: Hirundinidae

Bulbuls
Order: PasseriformesFamily: Pycnonotidae

Leaf warblers
Order: PasseriformesFamily: Phylloscopidae

Bush warblers and allies
Order: PasseriformesFamily: Scotocercidae

White-eyes, yuhinas, and allies

Order: PasseriformesFamily: Zosteropidae

Starlings
Order: PasseriformesFamily: Sturnidae

Thrushes and allies
Order: PasseriformesFamily: Turdidae

Old World flycatchers
Order: PasseriformesFamily: Muscicapidae

Flowerpeckers
Order: PasseriformesFamily: Dicaeidae

Waxbills and allies
Order: PasseriformesFamily: Estrildidae

Old World sparrows
Order: PasseriformesFamily: Passeridae

Wagtails and pipits
Order: PasseriformesFamily: Motacillidae

Finches, euphonias, and allies
Order: PasseriformesFamily: Fringillidae

See also
List of Australian birds
 Lists of birds by region

References

Western Australia
'
birds